Murga is a village and council located in the municipality of Aiara, in Álava province, Basque Country, Spain. As of 2020, it has a population of 128.

Geography 
Murga is located 44km northwest of Vitoria-Gasteiz.

References

Populated places in Álava